Otto Dahl may refer to:

 Otto Dahl (politician) (1914–1978), Norwegian politician
 Otto Dahl (engineer) (1864–1938), Norwegian engineer and sportsman
 Otto Christian Dahl (1903–1995), Norwegian missionary, linguist, and government scholar

See also
 Ottar Dahl (1924–2011), Norwegian historian and historiographer